Kochavi is a Hebrew surname – כּוֹכָבִי – which is also sometimes transliterated as Kohavi. Notable people with the surname include:

Amit L. Kochavi (born 1997), Israeli entrepreneur
Arye Kohavi (born 1967), Israeli entrepreneur
Aviv Kochavi (born 1964), Israeli chief of military staff
Doron Kochavi (born 1951), Israeli lawyer, businessperson, and philanthropist
Moshe Kochavi (1928–2008), Israeli archeologist

It is also occasionally used as a personal name, e.g.:

Kochavi Shemesh (1944-2019), Israeli lawyer, leader of Israeli Black Panthers